Michael J. Berman is an American businessman, responsible for founding George magazine with John F. Kennedy, Jr. in 1995. Due to Kennedy's fame, it was the largest magazine launch that year. At the time of the launch, Berman owned a New York public relations firm.

The two had apparently been quietly working on the project for several years before selling an interest to global publisher Hachette Filipacchi Media, which was responsible for its launch. Berman sold his share of the company in 1997 and continued to serve as Georges president until 1998. 
 
Berman has subsequently headed several media-related and investment companies, including holding the post of chairman at Novix Media and president and Chief Operating Officer of Hachette Productions, a Hachette Filipacchi subsidiary that focuses on film and television media. As of 2003, he serves as president of Galaxy Ventures.

References 

American chief operating officers
American magazine founders
American magazine publishers (people)
Businesspeople from New York City
Living people
Year of birth missing (living people)